Sir Joseph-Mathias Tellier (January 15, 1861 – October 18, 1952) was a Canadian politician born in Sainte-Mélanie, Quebec, Canada.

Biography
He was a Quebec Conservative Party leader, but never Premier (his party lost the 1912 election, and Lomer Gouin became Premier of Quebec) . He was in the Legislative Assembly of Quebec from 1892 to 1916, as a Member for the riding of Joliette .

After his studies at Université Laval, he was admitted to the Barreau du Quebec and he practiced law for over 15 years.

He was mayor of Joliette from 1903 to 1910, and, in 1916, he became a Quebec Superior Court judge.  He was Chief Justice of Quebec from 1932 to 1942.

He was made a Knight of the Order of Pius IX in 1906. He was Knighted by King George V in 1934.

Sir Joseph-Mathias Tellier is the brother of Louis Tellier, the father of Maurice Tellier, the grandfather of Paul Tellier, and a first cousin of Raymond Tellier, who is the grandfather of Luc-Normand Tellier.

Elections as party leader
He lost the 1912 election against Sir Lomer Gouin.

Note

See also
List of Quebec leaders of the Opposition

References

External links
 

1861 births
1952 deaths
Canadian Knights Bachelor
Conservative Party of Quebec MNAs
Judges in Quebec
Knights of the Order of Pope Pius IX
Lawyers in Quebec
Mayors of places in Quebec
Quebec political party leaders
Université Laval alumni